St Leonard, Saint-Léonard or Saint-Leonard may refer to:

Saints
 Saint Leonard of Noblac (or of Limoges) (died c.559)
 Saint Leonard of Port Maurice (1676–1751)

Places

Canada
 Saint-Léonard, New Brunswick, town in Madawaska County, formerly named St. Leonard
 Saint-Léonard Parish, New Brunswick, formerly named St. Leonard Parish
 Saint-Leonard, Quebec, a former city and now a borough of Montreal, Quebec, Canada
 Saint-Léonard (electoral district), a federal electoral district in Quebec, Canada
 Saint-Léonard—Saint-Michel, a federal electoral district in Quebec, Canada
 Saint-Léonard—Anjou a former federal electoral district in Quebec, Canada

France
 Belloy-Saint-Léonard, France
 Saint-Léonard, a hamlet, part of the commune of Bœrsch, in the Bas-Rhin department
 Saint-Léonard, Gers
 Saint-Léonard, commune of the Angers department
 Saint-Léonard, Marne
 Saint-Léonard, Pas-de-Calais
 Saint-Léonard, Seine-Maritime
 Saint-Léonard, Vosges
 Saint-Léonard, commune of the Epiniac department
 Saint-Léonard-de-Noblat, commune of the Haute-Vienne department
 Saint-Léonard-des-Bois, commune of the Sarthe department
 Saint-Léonard-des-Parcs, commune of the Orne department
 Saint-Léonard-en-Beauce, commune of the Loir-et-Cher department

Switzerland
 Saint-Léonard, Switzerland

United Kingdom
 Berwick St. Leonard, Wiltshire
 Drayton St. Leonard, Oxfordshire
Saint Leonards, Sandridge, Herts. England. 900 years.

United States
 St. Leonard, Maryland, a place in Calvert County

Churches 

St Leonard, Eastcheap, London
St Leonard, Foster Lane, London

In sport
 Patinoire Saint-Léonard, indoor sporting arena located in Fribourg, Switzerland

See also
 San Leonardo (disambiguation)
 St Leonards (disambiguation)
 Leonard (disambiguation)
 Leonard (surname)
 Lenny (disambiguation)
 Leonardo (disambiguation)